Lyngstad is a Norwegian surname. Notable people with this surname include the following:

Anni-Frid Lyngstad, Norwegian-Swedish singer and one of the four members of Swedish pop group ABBA
Arne Lyngstad, Norwegian politician for the Christian Democratic Party
Bjarne Lyngstad (1901–1971), Norwegian politician for the Liberal Party  
Ola Torstensen Lyngstad (1894–1952), Norwegian newspaper editor and politician for the Liberal Party 

Norwegian-language surnames